Petra Göbel (born 24 March 1971), is an Austrian athlete who competes in compound archery. She started archery in 1992 and first represented the national senior team in 1996. Her achievements include a silver medal at the 2002 European Grand Prix, a bronze medal at the 2012 World Archery Field Championships and becoming the world number one ranked archer in July 2003.

References

1971 births
Living people
Austrian female archers
World Games gold medalists

Competitors at the 2009 World Games
World Games medalists in archery